Sadi Celil Cengiz (born 1 February 1983) is a Turkish actor.

Filmography

References

External links
 
 SinemaTürk

1983 births
21st-century Turkish male actors
Turkish male television actors
Turkish people of Circassian descent
Living people